is a dam in Miyazaki Prefecture, Japan, completed in 1961.

References

External links
Japan Dam Foundation, Morozuka dam, damnet.or.jp 

Dams in Miyazaki Prefecture
Dams completed in 1961